The 2008 FIFA Futsal World Cup – Second Round took place from 11 October to 14 October 2008.

Group E

Group F 

- Second Round, 2008 Fifa Futsal World Cup